County routes in Putnam County, New York, known within the county as "county roads", are owned and maintained by the Putnam County Department of Highways and Facilities.

Most of the county road numbers, which are all two-digits, are signed with the standard yellow-on-blue pentagon route marker specified by the Manual on Uniform Traffic Control Devices (sign M1–6), which is also used in other counties throughout the state. However, the frequency of signage for county routes is not as high as that of state route signage.  For instance, it is not uncommon for a road to have its number signed only on it and not on intersecting roads. This is reflected in local vernacular, as most residents refer to the county roads by name and not by number.

The first digit of a county road number indicates a town along the road, usually the town of origin. Exceptions to this scheme exist, however. The three villages in Putnam County are included with their respective towns.
1 is Philipstown
2 is Putnam Valley
3 and 7 are Carmel
4 is Kent
5 is Southeast
6 is Patterson

On a town level, the numbers are assigned in a roughly west-to-east and south-to-north fashion. There is no known numbering scheme within the towns, as numbers are assigned based on the order of establishment. The presence of skipped numbers in the order (such as CR 31) implies that there are a few decommissioned roads, but some (like CR 52) were likely skipped intentionally to avoid confusion with state routes in the county.

Routes 1–50

Routes 51 and up

See also

County routes in New York

References

External links

Empire State Roads – Putnam County Roads